Bukovlak is a village in Bulgaria. It is situated in Pleven municipality, Pleven Province.

References

Villages in Pleven Province